Light welterweight, also known as junior welterweight or super lightweight, is a weight class in combat sports.

Boxing

Professional boxing
In professional boxing, light welterweight is contested between the lightweight and welterweight divisions, in which boxers weigh above 61.2kg or 135 pounds and up to 63.5 kg or 140 pounds. The first champion of this weight class was Pinky Mitchell in 1946, though he was only awarded his championship by a vote of the readers of the Boxing Blade magazine.

There was not widespread acceptance of this new weight division in its early years, and the New York State Athletic Commission withdrew recognition of it in 1930. The National Boxing Association continued to recognize it until its champion, Barney Ross relinquished the title in 1935 to concentrate on regaining the welterweight championship.

A few commissions recognized bouts in the 1940s as being for the light welterweight title, but the modern beginnings of this championship date from 1959 when Carlos Ortiz won the vacant title with a victory over Kenny Lane. Both the World Boxing Association (WBA) and the World Boxing Council (WBC) recognized the same champions until 1967, when the WBC stripped Paul Fuji of the title and matched Pedro Adigue and Adolph Pruitt for their version of the championship. Adigue won a fifteen-round decision. The International Boxing Federation (IBF) recognized Aaron Pryor as its first champion in 1984. Hector Camacho became the first World Boxing Organization (WBO) champion with his victory against Ray Mancini in 1989.

Current world champions

Current world rankings

The Ring
As of December 10, 2022.

Keys:
 Current The Ring world champion

BoxRec

.

Amateur boxing
In amateur boxing, light welterweight is a weight class for fighters weighing up to 64 kilograms. For the 1952 Summer Olympics, the division was created when the span from 54–67 kg was changed from three weight classes (featherweight, lightweight, and welterweight) to four. Perhaps the most famous amateur light welterweight champion is Sugar Ray Leonard, who went on to an impressive professional career.

Olympic Champions

1952 – 
1956 – 
1960 – 
1964 – 
1968 – 
1972 – 
1976 – 
1980 – 
1984 – 
1988 – 
1992 – 
1996 – 
2000 – 
2004 – 
2008 – 
2012 – 
2016 –

Notable fighters

Saensak Muangsurin
Saoul Mamby
Tippy Larkin
Aaron Pryor
Carlos Morocho Hernández
Antonio Cervantes
Julio César Chávez
Oscar De La Hoya
Pernell Whitaker
Kostya Tszyu
Duilio Loi
Eddie Perkins
Erik Morales
Ricky Hatton
Manny Pacquiao
Floyd Mayweather Jr.
Amir Khan
Juan Manuel Márquez
Nicolino Locche
Micky Ward
Arturo Gatti
Marijan Beneš
Danny García
Devon Alexander
Ruslan Provodnikov
Alexis Arguello
Timothy Bradley
Viktor Postol
Wilfred Benítez
Miguel Cotto
Terence Crawford
Julius Indongo
Paulie Malignaggi
Junior Witter
Regis Prograis
Josh Taylor

Kickboxing
 In the International Kickboxing Federation (IKF), Super lightweight is 132.1 - 137 lbs or 60.04 - 62.27 kg, & Light welterweight is 137.1 - 142 lbs or 62.31 - 64.54 kg.

Lethwei
In World Lethwei Championship Antonio Faria is the Light welterweight Champion.

References

External links

Boxing weight classes
Kickboxing weight classes